The U.S. Army Creed of the Noncommissioned Officer, otherwise known as the Noncommissioned Officer's Creed, and commonly shortened to the NCO creed, is a tool used in the United States Army to educate and remind enlisted leaders of their responsibilities and authority, and serves as a code of conduct. Each branch has their own version, and many have been altered over the years.

Army Creed of the Noncommissioned Officer 
In 1973, the United States Army was in turmoil as a result of the Vietnam War drawing to an end. Some of the contributing factors to the perceived degradation of the NCO Corps was the end of the draft "Modern Volunteer Army", Secretary of Defense Robert MacNamara's "Project 100,000" and the Noncommissioned officer candidate course. Many Sergeants were trained only to perform one specific job, for example, squad leaders in infantry units, and were no longer uniformly regarded as the well-rounded professionals of previous generations. The overhaul of the NCO Corps involved rewriting Field Manual 22–100, Leadership.

One of the initiatives to rebuild the NCO Corps was the NCO Education System, which included a then-newly created NCO Subcommittee of the Command and Leadership Committee in the Leadership Department at the United States Army Infantry School at Fort Benning. Besides training Soldiers at the Noncommissioned Officers Academy, select NCOs developed instructional material to be used throughout the Army. During a brainstorming session, SFC Earle Brigham and Jimmie Jakes Sr. were credited with writing on a sheet of paper the three letters "N C O", and the committee began building a creed, a "yardstick by which to measure themselves." When it was ultimately approved, The Creed of the Noncommssioned Officer was printed on the inside cover of the special texts issued to students, beginning in 1974. Though The Creed of the Noncommissioned Officer was submitted higher for approval and distribution Army-wide, it was not formalized by an official army publication until 11 years later.

The Army dedicated 2009 as the "Year of the NCO".

The initial letters of each paragraph are, in order, N C O.

'Tactically' and 'technically' discrepancy
For almost the first 20 years, many Army Creeds of the Noncommissioned Officer in publication had the second sentence in the second paragraph as I will strive to remain tactically and technically proficient. However, in 2001 the Army had a team of contractors who created FM 7-22.7, The Army Noncommissioned Officer Guide who apparently transposed the sentence to I will strive to remain technically and tactically proficient. To compound the problem the NCO Journal printed a story in the May 2010 edition which correctly identified that a field manual has precedence over other forms of publication (e.g., DA pamphlet), so it must be right. No historical research appeared to have been conducted, and it is unknown if any of the sources cited in the original research by Elder and Sanchez were consulted.

Marine Corps

NCO creed
There have been several version of the Marine NCO creed. One version was revised in February 2006 under Navy and Marine Corps Directive 1500.58, Marine Corps Mentoring Program Guidebook. That directive has since been cancelled in July, 2017. The version of the NCO creed before that directive was canceled was:

The unofficial NCO creed was an excerpt from Warrior Culture of the U.S. Marines, copyright 2001 Marion F. Sturkey. That version, which is still frequently used, read:

SNCO creed
Because the Marine Corps emphasizes the additional responsibility upon Staff Noncommissioned Officers, they have their own creed:

Navy

Air Force
The US Air Force has utilized several different creeds (the NCO Creed, the SNCO Creed, the Chief's creed, the First Sergeant's Creed, the Security Forces Creed, etc.).  However, as of April 2007 all the creeds used in the Air Force were replaced by The Airman's Creed.

Noncommissioned Officer creed
No one is more professional than I. I am a Noncommissioned Officer: a leader of people. I am proud of the Noncommissioned Officer corps and will, at all times, conduct myself so as to bring credit upon it. I will not use my grade or position to attain profit or safety.

So, what does this mean to me as an NCO?
What this means is, I as an NCO will continually seek to better myself by going to my career schooling and absorbing what I learn from my senior NCO's, it means that I will lead to the best of my abilities and treat all soldiers with respect, courteousness and fairness.

Competence is my watchword. I will strive to remain tactically and technically proficient. I will always be aware of my role as a Noncommissioned Officer. I will fulfill my responsibilities and display professionalism at all times. I will strive to know my people and use their skills to the maximum degree possible. I will always place their needs above my own and will communicate with my supervisor and my people and never leave them uninformed

So, what does this mean to me as an NCO?
It means that I will do my best to be proficient in my assigned jobs and learn from past tasks, it means that I will stay cognizant of my role as an NCO and fulfill my duties to the best of my abilities and take pride in what I do, no matter how others portray my accomplishments. 
It means that I know my soldiers and know how to use them in a manner that promotes the units needs. It means that I will take care of my soldiers fairly and mentor them to become better soldiers and would not ask them to do something I wouldn't do or have not done before.
It means to me that I will keep my soldiers and senior NCO'S informed and they will keep me informed of changes and any information that pertains to me.
 
I will exert every effort and risk any ridicule to successfully accomplish my assigned duties. I will not look at a person and see any race, creed, color, religion, sex, age, or national origin, for I will only see the person; nor will I ever show prejudice or bias. I will lead by example and will resort to disciplinary action only when necessary.

SO, what does this mean to me as an NCO?
It mean I will take pride in my assigned duties and accomplish them to the best of my abilities.
It means to me that I see that person not by race, creed, color, religion, sex, age, or origin but as an individual.
It means I will treat all soldiers fairly, equally without malice or without bias.
It means to me that I will lead by example and only resort to disciplinary action when appropriate 
It means to me that I will also give positive counseling when soldiers go above their responsibilities.

 
I will carry out the orders of my superiors to the best of ability and will always obey the decisions of my superiors. I will give all officers my maximum support to ensure mission accomplishments. I will earn their respect, obey their orders, and establish a high degree of integrity with them. I will exercise initiative in the absence of orders and will make decisive and accurate decisions. I will never compromise my integrity, nor my moral courage. I will not forget that I am a Professional, a Leader, but above all a Noncommissioned Officer.

SNCO creed

See also
 Code of the U.S. Fighting Force
 U.S. Soldier's Creed
 Rifleman's Creed
 Sailor's Creed
 Airman's Creed
 Creed of the United States Coast Guardsman
Ranger Creed

References

 Various US military creeds
 
 Marine NCO and SNCO creeds

United States military traditions
United States Marine Corps lore and symbols
United States Navy traditions
Codes of conduct
Military doctrines
Warrior code